Cerise ( or) is a deep to vivid reddish pink.

Etymology

The colour or name comes from the French word , meaning "cherry".

According to the Oxford English Dictionary, the first recorded use of cerise as a colour name in English was in The Times of November 30, 1858. This date of 1858 as the date of first use of the color name is also mentioned in the 1930 book A Dictionary of Color. However, it was used at least as early as 1845 in a book of crochet patterns.

Variations of cerise

There are various tones of cerise.

Hollywood cerise

In the 1950s, a popular brand of colored pencils, Venus Paradise, had a colored pencil called Hollywood cerise which was this color.  Before being renamed Hollywood cerise in the 1940s, the color had been known, since its inception in 1922, simply as Hollywood.

Deep cerise

Displayed at the right is the deep tone of cerise called cerise in Crayola crayons (see the List of Crayola crayon colors).

The color name cerise has been used for this color since 1993 by Crayola.

Irresistible

The color irresistible is displayed at right.

The color name irresistible first came into use in the Plochere Color System, a color system formulated in 1948 that is widely used by interior designers.

The normalized color coordinates for irresistible are identical to raspberry rose, which was first recorded as a color name in English in 1950 in the Descriptive Color Names Dictionary.

See also 
 Fuchsia (color)
 Rose (color)
 Lists of colors

References

External links 
 Crayola crayon history, including Cerise, added in 1993

Quaternary colors
Shades of violet